Sten Elliot (24 December 1925 – 16 January 2022) was a Swedish sailor who competed in the 1960 Summer Olympics. He was born in Göteborg on 24 December 1925, and died on 16 January 2022, at the age of 96.

References

1925 births
2022 deaths
Olympic sailors of Sweden
Sailors at the 1960 Summer Olympics – Dragon
Sportspeople from Gothenburg
Swedish male sailors (sport)